The 1992 Toronto Blue Jays season was the franchise's 16th season of Major League Baseball. Toronto finished first in the American League East for the fourth time with a record of 96 wins and 66 losses, closing the season with an attendance record of 4,028,318. Toronto was not swept in a single series all year, becoming the first team in 49 years to accomplish the feat.

In the American League Championship Series, the Blue Jays defeated the Oakland Athletics in six games for their first American League pennant in four tries.  In the World Series, Toronto faced the Atlanta Braves, who had won their second straight National League pennant, but lost the previous year's World Series. The Blue Jays prevailed in six games, becoming the first non-U.S.-based team to win a World Series.

Offseason
October 28, 1991: Cory Snyder was released by the Toronto Blue Jays.
December 12, 1991: Eric Plunk was signed as a free agent with the Toronto Blue Jays.
December 18, 1991: The Blue Jays sign pitcher Jack Morris as a free agent.
December 19, 1991: Dave Winfield was signed as a free agent with the Toronto Blue Jays.
March 27, 1992: Eric Plunk was released by the Toronto Blue Jays.

Spring training
The Toronto Blue Jays spent their 16th spring training at Dunedin, Florida, while playing their home exhibition games at Dunedin Stadium at Grant Field for the 3rd spring training season.

Regular season
Despite their post-season success, the Blue Jays had many ups and downs during the regular season. The Jays started off winning the first six games of the regular season and Roberto Alomar was named the AL Player of the Month for the month of April.

On August 25, they had lost six of their last seven games and were only two games ahead of the Baltimore Orioles in the standings. At this point, general manager Pat Gillick decided to acquire a fiery right-hander from the New York Mets named David Cone. The trade resulted in the Jays sending minor league prospect Ryan Thompson and utility infielder Jeff Kent to the Mets.
The deal sent the message that the Blue Jays were committed to winning. Cone would have 4 wins, 3 losses and a 2.55 ERA.

The regular season also marked the end of the road for Dave Stieb, who made his last start for the Blue Jays on August 8 and only lasted three innings. On September 23, Stieb announced that he was finished for the season. 1992 was Stieb's final season for the Jays before briefly coming out of retirement years later.

Four days later, on September 27, Jack Morris would make club history by becoming the first pitcher in franchise history to win 20 games in a season. Morris would have to wait through a two-hour rain delay at Yankee Stadium to get the win.

Heading into the last weekend of the season, only the Milwaukee Brewers were still in contention. Led by manager Phil Garner, the Brewers had won 22 of 29 games since August 29. The Brewers trailed the Blue Jays by 2 games, and the Jays were heading into a weekend series vs. the Detroit Tigers. On October 3, Juan Guzmán had a one-hitter through eight innings and Duane Ward picked up the save as the Jays won the game 3-1 and clinched the American League East Division title.

Season standings

Record vs. opponents

Opening Day starters

 Devon White, CF
 Roberto Alomar, 2B
 Joe Carter, LF
 Dave Winfield, DH
 John Olerud, 1B
 Derek Bell, RF
 Kelly Gruber, 3B
 Pat Borders, C
 Manuel Lee, SS
 Jack Morris, P

Transactions
April 3, 1992: Shawn Hillegas was selected off waivers by the Toronto Blue Jays from the Cleveland Indians.
June 1, 1992: Tim Crabtree was drafted by the Toronto Blue Jays in the 2nd round of the 1992 amateur draft. Player signed June 4, 1992.
July 9, 1992: Kelvim Escobar was signed by the Toronto Blue Jays as an amateur free agent.
July 30, 1992: Traded Rob Ducey and Greg Myers to the California Angels for Mark Eichhorn.
August 1, 1992: Terry McGriff was signed as a free agent with the Toronto Blue Jays.
August 27, 1992: Traded Jeff Kent and Ryan Thompson to the New York Mets for David Cone.

Roster

Game log

|-  style="text-align:center; background:#bfb;"
| 1 || April 6 || @ Tigers || 4–2 || Morris (1–0) || Gullickson (0–1) || || Tiger Stadium || 51,068 || 1–0 || W1
|-  style="text-align:center; background:#bfb;"
| 2 || April 8 || @ Tigers || 10–9 || Henke (1–0) || Tanana (0–1) || Ward (1) || Tiger Stadium || 12,819 || 2–0 || W2
|-  style="text-align:center; background:#bfb;"
| 3 || April 9 || @ Tigers || 3–1 || Guzmán (1–0) || Terrell (0–1) || Ward (2) || Tiger Stadium || 9,720 || 3–0 || W3
|-  style="text-align:center; background:#bfb;"
| 4 || April 10 || Orioles || 4–3 || Hentgen (1–0) || Olson (0–1) || || SkyDome || 50,424 || 4–0 || W4
|-  style="text-align:center; background:#bfb;"
| 5 || April 11 || Orioles || 7–2 || Morris (2–0) || Sutcliffe (1–1) || || SkyDome || 50,375 || 5–0 || W5
|-  style="text-align:center; background:#bfb;"
| 6 || April 12 || Orioles || 3–1 || Wells (1–0) || Mesa (0–1) || Ward (3) || SkyDome || 48,309 || 6–0 || W6
|-  style="text-align:center; background:#fbb;"
| 7 || April 13 || Yankees || 2–5 || Howe (1–0) || Stottlemyre (0–1) || Farr (2) || SkyDome || 44,115 || 6–1 || L1
|-  style="text-align:center; background:#bfb;"
| 8 || April 14 || Yankees || 12–6 || Guzmán (2–0) || Johnson (0–1) || || SkyDome || 45,579 || 7–1 || W1
|-  style="text-align:center; background:#bfb;"
| 9 || April 15 || Yankees || 2–0 || Key (1–0) || Pérez (1–1) || Henke (1) || SkyDome || 48,111 || 8–1 || W2
|-  style="text-align:center; background:#bfb;"
| 10 || April 16 || Yankees || 7–6 || Ward (1–0) || Farr (0–1) || || SkyDome || 50,376 || 9–1 || W3
|-  style="text-align:center; background:#fbb;"
| 11 || April 17 || @ Red Sox || 0–1 || Clemens (2–1) || Wells (1–1) || Reardon (2) || Fenway Park || 27,467 || 9–2 || L1
|-  style="text-align:center; background:#bfb;"
| 12 || April 18 || @ Red Sox || 2–1 || Stottlemyre (1–1) || Viola (0–2) || Henke (2) || Fenway Park || 32,640 || 10–2 || W1
|-  style="text-align:center; background:#fbb;"
| 13 || April 19 || @ Red Sox || 4–5 || Darwin (1–0) || Henke (1–1) || || Fenway Park || 28,196 || 10–3 ||L1
|-  style="text-align:center; background:#bfb;"
| 14 || April 20 || @ Red Sox || 6–4 (13) || MacDonald (1–0) || Bolton (0–1) || || Fenway Park || 34,709 || 11–3 || W1
|-  style="text-align:center; background:#bfb;"
| 15 || April 21 || Indians || 2–1 || Morris (3–0) || Cook (0–2) || || SkyDome || 40,191 || 12–3 || W2
|-  style="text-align:center; background:#fbb;"
| 16 || April 22 || Indians || 2–7 || Nagy (3–1) || Stieb (0–1) || Power (1) || SkyDome || 43,292 || 12–4 || L1
|-  style="text-align:center; background:#bfb;"
| 17 || April 23 || Indians || 13–8 || Stottlemyre (2–1) || Otto (1–2) || || SkyDome || 42,401 || 13–4 || W1
|- align="center" bgcolor="bbffbb"
| 18 || April 24 || Royals || 4–3 || Guzmán (3–0) || Gordon (0–2) || Henke (3) || SkyDome || 50,352 || 14–4 || W2
|- align="center" bgcolor="bbffbb"
| 19 || April 25 || Royals || 6–4 || Hentgen (2–0) || Young (0–1) || Ward (4) || SkyDome || 50,346 || 15–4 || W3
|-  style="text-align:center; background:#fbb;"
| 20 || April 26 || Royals || 0–9 || Gubicza (1–2) || Morris (3–1) || || SkyDome || 46,486 || 15–5 || L1
|-  style="text-align:center; background:#fbb;"
| 21 || April 28 || Angels || 5–9 || Finley (1–1) || Stieb (0–2) || || SkyDome || 46,201 || 15–6 || L2
|-  style="text-align:center; background:#bfb;"
| 22 || April 29 || Angels || 1–0 || Stottlemyre (3–1) || Abbott (1–3) || || SkyDome || 47,356 || 16–6 || W1
|-  style="text-align:center; background:#fbb;"
| 23 || April 30 || @ Brewers || 2–3 || Bosio (2–1) || Ward (1–1) || Henry (4) || County Stadium || 8,877 || 16–7 || L1
|-

|-  style="text-align:center; background:#fbb;"
| 24 || May 1 || @ Brewers || 3–4 || Navarro (2–2) || Key (1–1) || Henry (5) || County Stadium || 13,794 || 16–8 || L2
|-  style="text-align:center; background:#fbb;"
| 25 || May 2 || @ Brewers || 4–5 || Fetters (1–0) || Morris (3–2) || Henry (6) || County Stadium || 26,547 || 16–9 || L3
|-  style="text-align:center; background:#bfb;"
| 26 || May 3 || @ Brewers || 4–1 || Stieb (1–2) || Wegman (2–2) || || County Stadium || 17,312 || 17–9 || W1
|-  style="text-align:center; background:#bfb;"
| 27 || May 4 || @ Athletics || 7–3 || Stottlemyre (4–1) || Darling (1–2) || || Oakland–Alameda County Coliseum || 20,137 || 18–9 || W2
|-  style="text-align:center; background:#bfb;"
| 28 || May 5 || @ Athletics || 5–1 || Guzmán (4–0) || Slusarski (2–1) || Ward (5) || Oakland–Alameda County Coliseum || 18,753 || 19–9 || W3
|-  style="text-align:center; background:#bfb;"
| 29 || May 6 || @ Mariners || 12–4 || Key (2–1) || Johnson (3–2) || || Kingdome || 12,771 || 20–9 || W4
|-  style="text-align:center; background:#bfb;"
| 30 || May 7 || @ Mariners || 8–7 || Hentgen (3–0) || Schooler (0–2) || Henke (4) || Kingdome || 13,347 || 21–9 || W5
|-  style="text-align:center; background:#fbb;"
| 31 || May 8 || @ Angels || 1–4 || Eichhorn (1–2) || Stieb (1–3) || || Anaheim Stadium || 36,383 || 21–10 || L1
|-  style="text-align:center; background:#fbb;"
| 32 || May 9 || @ Angels || 1–2 || Abbott (2–4) || Stottlemyre (4–2) || Harvey (10) || Anaheim Stadium || 36,159 || 21–11 || L2
|-  style="text-align:center; background:#bfb;"
| 33 || May 10 || @ Angels || 4–1 || Guzmán (5–0) || Grahe (2–3) || || Anaheim Stadium || 23,009 || 22–11 || W1
|-  style="text-align:center; background:#bfb;"
| 34 || May 12 || Athletics || 3–0 || Key (3–1) || Stewart (2–3) || Henke (5) || SkyDome || 50,407 || 23–11 || W2
|-  style="text-align:center; background:#bfb;"
| 35 || May 13 || Athletics || 4–3 || Morris (4–2) || Moore (4–2) || Henke (6) || SkyDome || 50,394 || 24–11 || W3
|-  style="text-align:center; background:#bfb;"
| 36 || May 14 || Mariners || 5–4 || Stieb (2–3) || Jones (1–1) || Wells (1) || SkyDome || 50,375 || 25–11 || W4
|-  style="text-align:center; background:#fbb;"
| 37 || May 15 || Mariners || 1–2 || Fleming (5–1) || Stottlemyre (4–3) || Schooler (6) || SkyDome || 50,405 || 25–12 || L1
|-  style="text-align:center; background:#fbb;"
| 38 || May 16 || Mariners || 6–7 || Powell (1–0) || Wells (1–2) || Schooler (7) || SkyDome || 50,385 || 25–13 || L2
|-  style="text-align:center; background:#fbb;"
| 39 || May 17 || Mariners || 2–3 || Johnson (4–3) || Key (3–2) || Schooler (8) || SkyDome || 50,364 || 25–14 || L3
|-  style="text-align:center; background:#fbb;"
| 40 || May 18 || Twins || 2–6 (11) || Wayne (1–1) || Ward (1–2) || || SkyDome || 50,391 || 25–15 || L4
|-  style="text-align:center; background:#fbb;"
| 41 || May 19 || Twins || 1–7 || Mahomes (3–1) || Stieb (2–4) || Edens (1) || SkyDome || 50,338 || 25–16 || L5
|-  style="text-align:center; background:#bfb;"
| 42 || May 20 || Twins || 8–7 (10) || Henke (2–1) || Aguilera (0–4) || || SkyDome || 50,125 || 26–16 || W1
|-  style="text-align:center; background:#bfb;"
| 43 || May 22 || @ White Sox || 6–2 || Guzmán (6–0) || McDowell (7–2) || Ward (6) || Comiskey Park || 37,446 || 27–16 || W2
|-  style="text-align:center; background:#fbb;"
| 44 || May 23 || @ White Sox || 2–5 || Hibbard (5–2) || Key (3–3) || Thigpen (12) || Comiskey Park || 39,293 || 27–17 || L1
|-  style="text-align:center; background:#fbb;"
| 45 || May 24 || @ White Sox || 1–8 || McCaskill (3–4) || Morris (4–3) || || Comiskey Park || 32,230 || 27–18 || L2
|-  style="text-align:center; background:#bfb;"
| 46 || May 26 || Brewers || 5–4 || Stieb (3–4) || Bones (1–2) || Henke (7) || SkyDome || 49,360 || 28–18 || W1
|-  style="text-align:center; background:#fbb;"
| 47 || May 27 || Brewers || 4–8 || Navarro (4–4) || Stottlemyre (4–4) || Henry (7) || SkyDome || 50,376 || 28–19 || L1
|-  style="text-align:center; background:#bfb;"
| 48 || May 29 || White Sox || 3–0 || Ward (2–2) || Hibbard (5–3) || Henke (8) || SkyDome || 50,408 || 29–19 || W1
|-  style="text-align:center; background:#bfb;"
| 49 || May 30 || White Sox || 2–1 (11) || Wells (2–2) || Pall (2–2) || || SkyDome || 50,391 || 30–19 || W2
|-  style="text-align:center; background:#bfb;"
| 50 || May 31 || White Sox || 3–2 || Morris (5–3) || Thigpen (0–2) || || SkyDome || 50,393 || 31–19 || W3
|-

|-  style="text-align:center; background:#bfb;"
| 51 || June 1 || @ Twins || 5–3 (10) || Ward (3–2) || Willis (1–2) || Henke (9) || Hubert H. Humphrey Metrodome || 20,134 || 32–19 || W4
|-  style="text-align:center; background:#bfb;"
| 52 || June 2 || @ Twins || 7–5 (13) || Hentgen (4–0) || Wayne (1–2) || Henke (10) || Hubert H. Humphrey Metrodome || 22,317 || 33–19 || W5
|-  style="text-align:center; background:#fbb;"
| 53 || June 3 || @ Twins || 3–11 || Tapani (6–4) || Guzmán (6–1) || || Hubert H. Humphrey Metrodome || 21,392 || 33–20 || L1
|-  style="text-align:center; background:#fbb;"
| 54 || June 5 || @ Orioles || 0–1 || Sutcliffe (8–4) || Key (3–4) || Olson (14) || Oriole Park at Camden Yards || 45,803 || 33–21 || L2
|-  style="text-align:center; background:#bfb;"
| 55 || June 6 || @ Orioles || 4–3 || Morris (6–3) || McDonald (7–3) || Henke (11) || Oriole Park at Camden Yards || 45,520 || 34–21 || W1
|-  style="text-align:center; background:#fbb;"
| 56 || June 7 || @ Orioles || 1–7 || Mussina (7–1) || Stieb (3–5) || || Oriole Park at Camden Yards || 45,620 || 34–22 || L1
|-  style="text-align:center; background:#bfb;"
| 57 || June 8 || @ Yankees || 16–3 || Stottlemyre (5–4) || Cadaret (3–5) || || Yankee Stadium || 18,166 || 35–22 || W1
|-  style="text-align:center; background:#bfb;"
| 58 || June 9 || @ Yankees || 2–1 || Guzmán (7–1) || Leary (4–5) || Henke (12) || Yankee Stadium || 22,429 || 36–22 || W2
|-  style="text-align:center; background:#bfb;"
| 59 || June 10 || @ Yankees || 10–3 || Key (4–4) || Sanderson (4–4) || Wells (2) || Yankee Stadium || 25,229 || 37–22 || W3
|-  style="text-align:center; background:#bfb;"
| 60 || June 11 || Red Sox || 4–0 || Morris (7–3) || Clemens (9–4) || || SkyDome || 50,423 || 38–22 || W4
|-  style="text-align:center; background:#fbb;"
| 61 || June 12 || Red Sox || 0–5 || Viola (6–4) || Stieb (3–6) || || SkyDome || 50,387 || 38–23 || L1
|-  style="text-align:center; background:#fbb;"
| 62 || June 13 || Red Sox || 3–5 || Hesketh (3–3) || Stottlemyre (5–5) || Reardon (14) || SkyDome || 50,397 || 38–24 || L2
|-  style="text-align:center; background:#bfb;"
| 63 || June 14 || Red Sox || 6–2 || Guzmán (8–1) || Gardiner (3–6) || Ward (7) || SkyDome || 50,412 || 39–24 || W1
|-  style="text-align:center; background:#fbb;"
| 64 || June 16 || Tigers || 3–4 || Gullickson (8–4) || Key (4–5) || Henneman (10) || SkyDome || 50,394 || 39–25 || L1
|-  style="text-align:center; background:#bfb;"
| 65 || June 17 || Tigers || 6–2 || Morris (8–3) || Ritz (1–2) || Ward (8) || SkyDome || 50,401 || 40–25 || W1
|-  style="text-align:center; background:#fbb;"
| 66 || June 18 || Tigers || 10–14 || Munoz (1–1) || Timlin (0–1) || Henneman (11) || SkyDome || 50,392 || 40–26 || L1
|-  style="text-align:center; background:#fbb;"
| 67 || June 19 || @ Royals || 4–11 || Gubicza (7–4) || Stottlemyre (5–6) || || Royals Stadium || 23,942 || 40–27 || L2
|-  style="text-align:center; background:#bfb;"
| 68 || June 20 || @ Royals || 6–1 || Guzmán (9–1) || Magnante (3–6) || || Royals Stadium || 29,194 || 41–27 || W1
|-  style="text-align:center; background:#fbb;"
| 69 || June 21 || @ Royals || 0–2 || Appier (7–3) || Key (4–6) || Montgomery (16) || Royals Stadium || 24,275 || 41–28 || L1
|-  style="text-align:center; background:#bfb;"
| 70 || June 22 || @ Rangers || 16–7 || Morris (9–3) || Guzmán (6–5) || || Arlington Stadium || 24,460 || 42–28 || W1
|-  style="text-align:center; background:#bbb;"
| -- || June 23 || @ Rangers || colspan=8|Postponed (rain) Rescheduled for September 10
|-  style="text-align:center; background:#bfb;"
| 71 || June 24 || @ Rangers || 3–2 || Wells (3–2) || Witt (8–6) || Henke (13) || Arlington Stadium || 23,798 || 43–28 || W2
|-  style="text-align:center; background:#bfb;"
| 72 || June 26 || @ Indians || 6–1 || Guzmán (10–1) || Armstrong (2–9) || || Cleveland Stadium || 16,299 || 44–28 || W6
|-  style="text-align:center; background:#fbb;"
| 73 || June 27 || @ Indians || 4–6 || Plunk (1–0) || Ward (3–3) || || Cleveland Stadium || 40,560 || 44–29 || L1
|-  style="text-align:center; background:#fbb;"
| 74 || June 28 || @ Indians || 6–7 || Olin (2–3) || Ward (3–4) || Plunk (1) || Cleveland Stadium || 23,560 || 44–30 || L2
|-  style="text-align:center; background:#bfb;"
| 75 || June 29 || Rangers || 11–4 || Hentgen (5–0) || Witt (8–7) || || SkyDome || 50,404 || 45–30 || W1
|-  style="text-align:center; background:#fbb;"
| 76 || June 30 || Rangers || 13–16 || Brown (12–4) || Wells (3–3) || || SkyDome || 50,396 || 45–31 || L1
|-

|-  style="text-align:center; background:#bfb;"
| 77 || July 1 || Rangers || 3–2 (10) || Ward (4–4) || Russell (2–3) || || SkyDome || 50,379 || 46–31 || W1
|-  style="text-align:center; background:#bfb;"
| 78 || July 3 || Angels || 10–1 || Key (5–6) || Langston (8–6) || || SkyDome || 50,408 || 47–31 || W2
|-  style="text-align:center; background:#bfb;"
| 79 || July 4 || Angels || 8–6 || Morris (10–3) || Eichhorn (1–4) || Henke (14) || SkyDome || 50,418 || 48–31 || W3
|-  style="text-align:center; background:#bfb;"
| 80 || July 5 || Angels || 6–2 || Wells (4–3) || Valera (4–8) || || SkyDome || 50,398 || 49–31 || W4
|-  style="text-align:center; background:#bfb;"
| 81 || July 6 || Angels || 3–0 || Guzmán (11–1) || Abbott (4–11) || Henke (15) || SkyDome || 50,406 || 50–31 || W5
|-  style="text-align:center; background:#bfb;"
| 82 || July 7 || Mariners || 4–3 || Ward (5–4) || Nelson (0–4) || || SkyDome || 50,397 || 51–31 || W6
|-  style="text-align:center; background:#bfb;"
| 83 || July 8 || Mariners || 6–0 || Key (6–6) || Hanson (6–11) || || SkyDome || 50,391 || 52–31 || W7
|-  style="text-align:center; background:#bfb;"
| 84 || July 9 || Athletics || 4–3 || Henke (3–1) || Gossage (0–2) || || SkyDome || 50,402 || 53–31 || W8
|-  style="text-align:center; background:#fbb;"
| 85 || July 10 || Athletics || 1–5 || Welch (7–4) || Wells (4–4) || || SkyDome || 50,399 || 53–32 || L1
|-  style="text-align:center; background:#fbb;"
| 86 || July 11 || Athletics || 1–3 || Moore (10–7) || Guzmán (11–2) || Eckersley (30) || SkyDome || 50,414 || 53–33 || L2
|-  style="text-align:center; background:#fbb;"
| 87 || July 12 || Athletics || 0–8 || Darling (8–7) || Hentgen (5–1) || || SkyDome || 50,392 || 53–34 || L3
|-  style="text-align:center; background:#bbb;"
| || July 14 || A.L. @ N.L.All-Star Game (AL wins—) || 13–6 || Brown (TEX) || Glavine (ATL) || || Jack Murphy Stadium || 59,372 || colspan=3|San Diego, California
|-  style="text-align:center; background:#bfb;"
| 88 || July 16 || @ Mariners || 7–2 || Morris (11–3) || Johnson (5–10) || || Kingdome || 52,711 || 54–34 || W1
|-  style="text-align:center; background:#fbb;"
| 89 || July 17 || @ Mariners || 6–8 || Hanson (8–11) || Key (6–7) || Swan (6) || Kingdome || 24,160 || 54–35 || L1
|-  style="text-align:center; background:#bfb;"
| 90 || July 18 || @ Mariners || 3–0 || Guzmán (12–2) || Fleming (11–4) || Henke (16) || Kingdome || 43,922 || 55–35 || W1
|-  style="text-align:center; background:#bfb;"
| 91 || July 19 || @ Mariners || 8–4 || Wells (5–4) || DeLucia (3–6) || || Kingdome || 28,560 || 56–35 || W2
|-  style="text-align:center; background:#fbb;"
| 92 || July 20 || @ Angels || 3–5 || Crim (4–2) || Hentgen (5–2) || Grahe (6) || Anaheim Stadium || 21,090 || 56–36 || L1
|-  style="text-align:center; background:#bfb;"
| 93 || July 21 || @ Angels || 9–5 || Morris (12–3) || Crim (4–3) || Ward (9) || Anaheim Stadium || 21,581 || 57–36 || W1
|-  style="text-align:center; background:#fbb;"
| 94 || July 22 || @ Angels || 4–5 || Grahe (3–3) || Key (6–8) || || Anaheim Stadium || 22,178 || 57–37 || L1
|-  style="text-align:center; background:#bfb;"
| 95 || July 23 || @ Athletics || 9–3 || Stieb (4–6) || Moore (10–9) || || Oakland–Alameda County Coliseum || 24,707 || 58–37 || W1
|-  style="text-align:center; background:#fbb;"
| 96 || July 24 || @ Athletics || 5–6 || Eckersley (3–0) || Henke (3–2) || || Oakland–Alameda County Coliseum || 30,206 || 58–38 || L1
|-  style="text-align:center; background:#fbb;"
| 97 || July 25 || @ Athletics || 0–6 || Darling (9–8) || Stottlemyre (5–7) || || Oakland–Alameda County Coliseum || 36,086 || 58–39 || L2
|-  style="text-align:center; background:#fbb;"
| 98 || July 26 || @ Athletics || 1–9 || Downs (2–2) || Morris (12–4) || || Oakland–Alameda County Coliseum || 34,595 || 58–40 || L3
|-  style="text-align:center; background:#bfb;"
| 99 || July 28 || Royals || 6–4 || Key (7–8) || Moeller (0–1) || Henke (17) || SkyDome || 50,392 || 59–40 || W1
|-  style="text-align:center; background:#fbb;"
| 100 || July 29 || Royals || 2–5 || Appier (12–3) || Timlin (0–2) || Montgomery (25) || SkyDome || 50,418 || 59–41 || L1
|-  style="text-align:center; background:#bfb;"
| 101 || July 30 || Royals || 3–0 || Wells (6–4) || Aquino (1–2) || Henke (18) || SkyDome || 50,417 || 60–41 || W1
|-  style="text-align:center; background:#bfb;"
| 102 || July 31 || Yankees || 13–2 || Stottlemyre (6–7) || Hillegas (1–5) || || SkyDome || 50,407 || 61–41 || W2
|-

|-  style="text-align:center; background:#bfb;"
| 103 || August 1 || Yankees || 3–1 || Morris (13–4) || Pérez (9–10) || Henke (19) || SkyDome || 50,420 || 62–41 || W3
|-  style="text-align:center; background:#bfb;"
| 104 || August 2 || Yankees || 7–6 || Eichhorn (3–4) || Habyan (3–5) || Ward (10) || SkyDome || 50,409 || 63–41 || W4
|-  style="text-align:center; background:#fbb;"
| 105 || August 3 || @ Red Sox || 1–7 || Clemens (12–7) || Guzmán (12–3) || || Fenway Park || 34,024 || 63–42 || L1
|-  style="text-align:center; background:#fbb;"
| 106 || August 4 || @ Red Sox || 4–9 || Hesketh (6–8) || Wells (6–5) || Harris (2) || Fenway Park || 33,294 || 63–43 || L2
|-  style="text-align:center; background:#bfb;"
| 107 || August 5 || @ Red Sox || 5–4 || Eichhorn (4–4) || Irvine (2–1) || Henke (20) || Fenway Park || 33,945 || 64–43 || W1
|-  style="text-align:center; background:#bfb;"
| 108 || August 6 || @ Tigers || 15–11 || Morris (14–4) || Tanana (9–7) || || Tiger Stadium || 27,969 || 65–43 || W2
|-  style="text-align:center; background:#fbb;"
| 109 || August 7 || @ Tigers || 2–7 || Gullickson (13–7) || Key (7–9) || || Tiger Stadium || 29,994 || 65–44 || L1
|-  style="text-align:center; background:#fbb;"
| 110 || August 8 || @ Tigers || 6–8 || Kiely (4–1) || Linton (0–1) || Henneman (19) || Tiger Stadium || 39,344 || 65–45 || L2
|-  style="text-align:center; background:#fbb;"
| 111 || August 9 || @ Tigers || 2–9 || Haas (1–0) || Wells (6–6) || || Tiger Stadium || 40,035 || 65–46 || L3
|-  style="text-align:center; background:#bfb;"
| 112 || August 10 || Orioles || 8–4 || Stottlemyre (7–7) || Mussina (11–5) || || SkyDome || 50,395 || 66–46 || W1
|-  style="text-align:center; background:#fbb;"
| 113 || August 11 || Orioles || 0–3 || Mills (8–2) || Morris (14–5) || Olson (27) || SkyDome || 50,421 || 66–47 || L1
|-  style="text-align:center; background:#fbb;"
| 114 || August 12 || Orioles || 4–11 || McDonald (12–7) || Key (7–10) || || SkyDome || 50,419 || 66–48 || L2
|-  style="text-align:center; background:#bfb;"
| 115 || August 13 || Orioles || 4–2 || Linton (1–1) || Rhodes (4–2) || Henke (21) || SkyDome || 50,405 || 67–48 || W1
|-  style="text-align:center; background:#bfb;"
| 116 || August 14 || @ Indians || 9–5 || Wells (7–6) || Nichols (2–3) || || Cleveland Stadium || 41,686 || 68–48 || W2
|-  style="text-align:center; background:#bbb;"
| -- || August 15 || @ Indians || colspan=8|Postponed (rain) Rescheduled for August 16
|-  style="text-align:center; background:#fbb;"
| 117 || August 16 || @ Indians || 2–4 || Cook (4–5) || Stottlemyre (7–8) || Olin (21) || Cleveland Stadium || n/a || 68–49 || L1
|-  style="text-align:center; background:#bfb;"
| 118 || August 16 || @ Indians || 6–2 || Morris (15–5) || Otto (5–9) || || Cleveland Stadium || 27,997 || 69–49 || W1
|-  style="text-align:center; background:#bfb;"
| 119 || August 18 || @ Brewers || 12–1 || Key (8–10) || Ruffin (1–5) || || County Stadium || 31,297 || 70–49 || W2
|-  style="text-align:center; background:#fbb;"
| 120 || August 19 || @ Brewers || 5–10 || Bosio (11–5) || Linton (1–2) || || County Stadium || 32,060 || 70–50 || L1
|-  style="text-align:center; background:#fbb;"
| 121 || August 20 || @ Brewers || 3–16 || Wegman (11–10) || Wells (7–7) || || County Stadium || 34,702 || 70–51 || L2
|-  style="text-align:center; background:#fbb;"
| 122 || August 21 || @ Twins || 1–5 || Smiley (13–6) || Stottlemyre (7–9) || || Hubert H. Humphrey Metrodome || 48,082 || 70–52 || L3
|-  style="text-align:center; background:#bfb;"
| 123 || August 22 || @ Twins || 4–2 || Morris (16–5) || West (1–2) || Henke (22) || Hubert H. Humphrey Metrodome || 50,465 || 71–52 || W1
|-  style="text-align:center; background:#fbb;"
| 124 || August 23 || @ Twins || 0–2 || Erickson (9–10) || Key (8–11) || || Hubert H. Humphrey Metrodome || 45,211 || 71–53 || L1
|-  style="text-align:center; background:#fbb;"
| 125 || August 24 || @ White Sox || 4–8 || Fernandez (6–7) || Linton (1–3) || || Comiskey Park || 32,837 || 71–54 || L2
|-  style="text-align:center; background:#fbb;"
| 126 || August 25 || @ White Sox || 3–6 || Hough (6–10) || Wells (7–8) || Hernández (4) || Comiskey Park || 29,450 || 71–55 || L3
|-  style="text-align:center; background:#bfb;"
| 127 || August 26 || @ White Sox || 9–0 || Stottlemyre (8–9) || McCaskill (9–10) || || Comiskey Park || 26,436 || 72–55 || W1
|-  style="text-align:center; background:#bfb;"
| 128 || August 27 || Brewers || 5–4 || Morris (17-5) || Navarro (14–9) || Henke (23) || SkyDome || 50,415 || 73–55 || W2
|-  style="text-align:center; background:#fbb;"
| 129 || August 28 || Brewers || 2–22 || Eldred (5–1) || Key (8–12) || || SkyDome || 50,408 || 73–56 || L1
|-  style="text-align:center; background:#fbb;"
| 130 || August 29 || Brewers || 2–7 || Bosio (12–5) || Cone (0–1) || Holmes (3) || SkyDome || 50,413 || 73–57 || L2
|-  style="text-align:center; background:#bfb;"
| 131 || August 30 || Brewers || 5–3 || Ward (6–4) || Wegman (11–12) || Henke (24) || SkyDome || 50,412 || 74–57 || W1
|-  style="text-align:center; background:#bfb;"
| 132 || August 31 || White Sox || 9–2 || Stottlemyre (9–9) || Hough (6–11) || || SkyDome || 50,417 || 75–57 || W2
|-

|-  style="text-align:center; background:#bfb;"
| 133 || September 1 || White Sox || 9–3 || Morris (18–5) || McCaskill (9–11) || || SkyDome || 50,409 || 76–57 || W3
|-  style="text-align:center; background:#fbb;"
| 134 || September 2 || White Sox || 2–3 || Hibbard (10–6) || Key (8–13) || Hernández (6) || SkyDome || 50,419 || 76–58 || L1
|-  style="text-align:center; background:#bfb;"
| 135 || September 4 || Twins || 16–5 || Cone (1–1) || Tapani (14–10) || || SkyDome || 50,420 || 77–58 || W1
|-  style="text-align:center; background:#bfb;"
| 136 || September 5 || Twins || 7–3 || Guzmán (13–3) || Smiley (14–7) || || SkyDome || 50,409 || 78–58 || W2
|-  style="text-align:center; background:#bfb;"
| 137 || September 6 || Twins || 4–2 || Stottlemyre (10–9) || Trombley (0–1) || Henke (25) || SkyDome || 50,421 || 79–58 || W3
|-  style="text-align:center; background:#fbb;"
| 138 || September 7 || @ Royals || 4–5 (12) || Magnante (4–7) || Wells (7–9) || || Royals Stadium || 21,015 || 79–59 || L1
|-  style="text-align:center; background:#bfb;"
| 139 || September 8 || @ Royals || 5–0 || Key (9–13) || Aquino (2–5) || || Royals Stadium || 15,454 || 80–59 || W1
|-  style="text-align:center; background:#bfb;"
| 140 || September 9 || @ Royals || 1–0 || Cone (2–1) || Appier (15–8) || Henke (26) || Royals Stadium || 15,454 || 81–59 || W2
|-  style="text-align:center; background:#bbb;"
| -- || September 10 || @ Rangers || colspan=8|Postponed (rain) Rescheduled for September 11
|-  style="text-align:center; background:#bfb;"
| 141 || September 11 || @ Rangers || 7–5 || Guzmán (14–3) || Chiamparino (0–2) || Henke (27) || Arlington Stadium || n/a || 82–59 || W3
|-  style="text-align:center; background:#fbb;"
| 142 || September 11 || @ Rangers || 3–4 || Pavlik (4–2) || Stottlemyre (10–10) || Burns (1) || Arlington Stadium || 19,396 || 82–60 || L1
|-  style="text-align:center; background:#bfb;"
| 143 || September 12 || @ Rangers || 4–2 || Morris (19–5) || Smith (0–1) || Henke (28) || Arlington Stadium || 27,178 || 83–60 || W1
|-  style="text-align:center; background:#bfb;"
| 144 || September 13 || @ Rangers || 7–2 || Key (10–13) || Brown (19–9) || Ward (11) || Arlington Stadium || 16,654 || 84–60 || W2
|-  style="text-align:center; background:#fbb;"
| 145 || September 14 || Indians || 1–2 || Mesa (7–10) || Cone (2–2) || Olin (26) || SkyDome || 50,394 || 84–61 || L1
|-  style="text-align:center; background:#bfb;"
| 146 || September 15 || Indians || 5–4 || Guzmán (15–3) || Embree (0–1) || Henke (29) || SkyDome || 49,487 || 85–61 || W1
|-  style="text-align:center; background:#fbb;"
| 147 || September 16 || Indians || 3–6 || Nagy (15–10) || Stottlemyre (10–11) || Power (6) || SkyDome || 50,416 || 85–62 || L1
|-  style="text-align:center; background:#bfb;"
| 148 || September 17 || Indians || 7–5 (10) || Ward (7–4) || Plunk (8–4) || || SkyDome || 50,408 || 86–62 || W1
|-  style="text-align:center; background:#bfb;"
| 149 || September 18 || Rangers || 13–0 || Key (11–13) || Brown (19–10) || || SkyDome || 50,416 || 87–62 || W2
|-  style="text-align:center; background:#bfb;"
| 150 || September 19 || Rangers || 1–0 || Cone (3–2) || Chiamparino (0–3) || Henke (30) || SkyDome || 50,421 || 88–62 || W3
|-  style="text-align:center; background:#fbb;"
| 151 || September 20 || Rangers || 5–7 || Guzmán (15–11) || Guzmán (15–4) || Whiteside (2) || SkyDome || 50,405 || 88–63 || L1
|-  style="text-align:center; background:#bfb;"
| 152 || September 22 || @ Orioles || 4–3 || Stottlemyre (11–11) || Sutcliffe (16–14) || Henke (31) || Oriole Park at Camden Yards || 45,104 || 89–63 || W1
|-  style="text-align:center; background:#fbb;"
| 153 || September 23 || @ Orioles || 1–4 || Rhodes (6–5) || Morris (19–6) || Olson (34) || Oriole Park at Camden Yards || 45,660 || 89–64 || L1
|-  style="text-align:center; background:#bfb;"
| 154 || September 24 || @ Orioles || 8–2 || Key (12–13) || McDonald (12–13) || || Oriole Park at Camden Yards || 45,739 || 90–64 || W1
|-  style="text-align:center; background:#bfb;"
| 155 || September 25 || @ Yankees || 3–1 || Cone (4–2) || Pérez (12–16) || Henke (32) || Yankee Stadium || 18,124 || 91–64 || W2
|-  style="text-align:center; background:#fbb;"
| 156 || September 26 || @ Yankees || 1–2 || Wickman (5–1) || Guzmán (15–5) || Farr (28) || Yankee Stadium || 23,438 || 91–65 || L1
|-  style="text-align:center; background:#bfb;"
| 157 || September 27 || @ Yankees || 12–2 || Morris (20–6) || Sanderson (12–10) || || Yankee Stadium || 21,413 || 92–65 || W1
|-  style="text-align:center; background:#bfb;"
| 158 || September 29 || Red Sox || 5–2 || Key (13–13) || Darwin (9–9) || Henke (33) || SkyDome || 50,418 || 93–65 || W2
|-  style="text-align:center; background:#fbb;"
| 159 || September 30 || Red Sox || 0–1 || Viola (13–12) || Cone (4–3) || || SkyDome || 50,420 || 93–66 || L1
|-

|-  style="text-align:center; background:#bfb;"
| 160 || October 2 || Tigers || 8–7 || Morris (21–6) || Gullickson (14–13) || Henke (34) || SkyDome || 50,418 || 94–66 || W1
|-  style="text-align:center; background:#bfb;"
| 161 || October 3 || Tigers || 3–1 || Guzmán (16–5) || Haas (5–3) || Ward (12) || SkyDome || 50,412 || 95–66 || W2
|-  style="text-align:center; background:#bfb;"
| 162 || October 4 || Tigers || 7–4 || Stottlemyre (12–11) || Aldred (3–8) || Timlin (1) || SkyDome || 50,421 || 96–66 || W3
|-

Player stats

Batting

Starters by position
Note: Pos = Position; G = Games played; AB = At bats; H = Hits; Avg. = Batting average; HR = Home runs; RBI = Runs batted in

Other batters
Note: G = Games played; AB = At bats; H = Hits; Avg. = Batting average; HR = Home runs; RBI = Runs batted in

Pitching

Starting pitchers
Note: G = Games pitched; IP = Innings pitched; W = Wins; L = Losses; ERA = Earned run average; SO = Strikeouts

Other pitchers
Note: G = Games pitched; IP = Innings pitched; W = Wins; L = Losses; ERA = Earned run average; SO = Strikeouts

Relief pitchers
Note: G = Games pitched; W = Wins; L = Losses; SV = Saves; ERA = Earned run average; SO = Strikeouts

Postseason

American League Championship Series

The Toronto Blue Jays entered the series with a three-man pitching rotation of Jack Morris, David Cone, and Juan Guzmán.

Game 1
October 7, Skydome

Game 2
October 8, Skydome

Game 3
October 10, Oakland–Alameda County Coliseum

Game 4
October 11, Oakland–Alameda County Coliseum

The defining moment of the Series came in the ninth inning of Game 4, when Toronto second baseman Roberto Alomar hit a game-tying 2-run home run off Athletics closer Dennis Eckersley. The Blue Jays would eventually win the game 7-6 in 11 innings and take a 3-1 series lead.

Game 5
October 12, Oakland–Alameda County Coliseum

Game 6
October 14, Skydome

With their victory in game 6, the 1992 Blue Jays became the first non-American-based team to go to the World Series.

World Series

Game 1
October 17, 1992, at Atlanta–Fulton County Stadium in Atlanta

Game 2
October 18, 1992, at Atlanta–Fulton County Stadium in Atlanta

Game 3
October 20, 1992, at SkyDome in Toronto

Game 4
October 21, 1992, at SkyDome in Toronto

Game 5
October 22, 1992, at SkyDome in Toronto

Game 6
October 24, 1992, at Atlanta–Fulton County Stadium in Atlanta

Postseason Game Log

|-  style="text-align:center; background:#fbb;"
| 1 || October 7 || Athletics || 3–4 || Russell (1–0) || Morris (0–1) || Eckersley (1) || SkyDome || 51,039 || 0–1 || L1
|-  style="text-align:center; background:#bfb;"
| 2 || October 8 || Athletics || 3–1 || Cone (1–0) || Moore (0–1) || Henke (1) || SkyDome || 51,114 || 1–1 || W1
|-  style="text-align:center; background:#bfb;"
| 3 || October 10 || @ Athletics || 7–5 || Guzman (1–0) || Darling (0–1) || Henke (2) || Oakland–Alameda County Coliseum || 46,911 || 2–1 || W2
|-  style="text-align:center; background:#bfb;"
| 4 || October 11 || @ Athletics || 7–6 (11) || Ward (1–0) || Downs (0–1) || Henke (3) || Oakland–Alameda County Coliseum || 47,732 || 3–1 || W3
|-  style="text-align:center; background:#fbb;"
| 5 || October 12 || @ Athletics || 2–6 || Stewart (1–0) || Cone (1–1) ||  || Oakland–Alameda County Coliseum || 44,955 || 3–2 || L1
|-  style="text-align:center; background:#bfb;"
| 6 || October 14 || Athletics || 9–2 || Guzman (2–0) || Moore (0–2) ||  || SkyDome || 51,335 || 4–2 || W1
|-

|-  style="text-align:center; background:#fbb;"
| 1 || October 17 || @ Braves || 1–3 || Glavine (1–0) || Morris (0–1) ||  || Atlanta–Fulton County Stadium || 51,763 || 0–1 || L1
|-  style="text-align:center; background:#bfb;"
| 2 || October 18 || @ Braves || 5–4 || Ward (1–0) || Reardon (0–1) || Henke (1) || Atlanta–Fulton County Stadium || 51,763 || 1–1 || W1
|-  style="text-align:center; background:#bfb;"
| 3 || October 20 || Braves || 3–2 || Ward (2–0) || Avery (0–1) ||  || SkyDome || 51,813 || 2–1 || W2
|-  style="text-align:center; background:#bfb;"
| 4 || October 21 || Braves || 2–1 || Key (1–0) || Glavine (1–1) || Henke (2) || SkyDome || 52,090 || 3–1 || W3
|-  style="text-align:center; background:#fbb;"
| 5 || October 22 || Braves || 2–7 || Smoltz (1–0) || Morris (0–2) || Stanton (1) || SkyDome || 52,268 || 3–2 || L1
|-  style="text-align:center; background:#bfb;"
| 6 || October 24 || @ Braves || 4–3 (11) || Key (2–0) || Leibrandt (0–1) || Timlin (1) || Atlanta–Fulton County Stadium || 51,763 || 4–2 || W1
|-

Award winners

Awards

The 1992 Toronto Blue Jays were inducted into the Ontario Sports Hall of Fame in 2001.

63rd MLB All-Star Game

Infielders

Outfielders

Pitchers

Farm system

LEAGUE CHAMPIONS: Myrtle Beach

References

External links
1992 Toronto Blue Jays at Baseball Reference
1992 Toronto Blue Jays at Baseball Almanac
1992 WS at Baseball Reference

Toronto Blue Jays seasons
American League East champion seasons
American League champion seasons
World Series champion seasons
Toronto Blue Jays season
Toronto
1992 in Toronto